Lars Sune Lindgren (born October 13, 1952) is a Swedish former ice hockey defenceman and a professional scout with the Vancouver Canucks of the National Hockey League (NHL). He featured in the 1982 Stanley Cup Finals with the Vancouver Canucks.

Lindgren started his career with Canucks as a player in 1978, after having played for Modo Hockey in Sweden. He also played for the Minnesota North Stars. He left the NHL after the 1984 season. He played one season in 1985–86 for Luleå HF of the SEL. He later became a coach for the team.

He was inducted into the Piteå Wall of Fame in 2006.

Career statistics

Regular season and playoffs

International

External links

1952 births
Living people
Luleå HF players
Minnesota North Stars players
Modo Hockey players
National Hockey League All-Stars
People from Piteå
Swedish ice hockey defencemen
Undrafted National Hockey League players
Vancouver Canucks players
Vancouver Canucks scouts
Sportspeople from Norrbotten County